Jedwin Johao Lester Arroyo (born 21 August 2002) is a Costa Rican footballer who currently plays as a midfielder for AD Guanacasteca.

Career statistics

Club

Notes

References

2002 births
Living people
Costa Rican footballers
Association football midfielders
Deportivo Saprissa players
Liga FPD players